Amanti e Segreti is a 2004 Italian six-part crime thriller miniseries directed by Gianni Lepre. Filming locations were Rome, Trieste, Ferrara and Tuscany.  The first episode aired 16 March 2004 on Rai Uno. The series was a success, with an audience of about 9 million viewers.  The series was sold to several foreign countries, including Japan, China, Latin America, Eastern Europe and Spain. A second season consisting in four episodes was produced and broadcast in 2005.

Cast

See also
List of Italian television series

References 

Italian television series